Gianluca Gorini (born 18 October 1970) is an Italian former professional racing cyclist. He rode in the 1995 Tour de France.

References

External links
 

1970 births
Living people
Italian male cyclists
People from Gorizia
Cyclists from Friuli Venezia Giulia